Thomas Porter was a member of the Wisconsin State Assembly.

He was born in what was then County Tyrone, Ireland. During the American Civil War, he served with the 30th Wisconsin Volunteer Infantry Regiment of the Union Army.

Political career
Porter was a member of the Assembly in 1885. Additionally, he was an alderman of Hudson, Wisconsin and a member of the county board of St. Croix County, Wisconsin. He was a Republican.

References

Politicians from County Tyrone
Irish emigrants to the United States (before 1923)
People from Hudson, Wisconsin
Republican Party members of the Wisconsin State Assembly
Wisconsin city council members
People of Wisconsin in the American Civil War
Union Army soldiers
1830 births
Year of death missing